Echeverría is a ghost station that was projected on line 4A of the Santiago Metro. It is located between La Cisterna and San Ramón stations, along the central axis of the Vespucio Sur Freeway, between Blas Vial and María Vial streets in the commune of La Cisterna, specifically at the intersection of Américo Vespucio with Ignacio Echeverría streets (on the north road) and Peró (on the south road).

This station was half-way built, with only the platforms and the walkway that crosses the highway being finished, with the station building, stairs, elevators, turnstiles and the mezzanine (where the ticket offices would be located) still to be built.

The main reason for its non-construction lies in the residential sector in its immediate surroundings, which would not reach the density that justifies its existence. It is possible that it will materialize in the coming years, to increase the population density in the sector.

References

External links 

Echeverría station on YouTube

Abandoned rapid transit stations
Santiago Metro stations
Santiago Metro Line 4A